Eupithecia tibetana is a moth in the family Geometridae. It is found in China (Tibet).

The wingspan is about 20–23 mm.

References

Moths described in 2004
tibetana
Moths of Asia